Westwood Boulevard is a street in Los Angeles that runs through the heart of Westwood Village and further south in West Los Angeles.

Route

Westwood Boulevard begins south of Sunset Boulevard in the campus of UCLA as Westwood Plaza. After exiting UCLA, it is one of two major thoroughfares in Westwood Village. Its intersection with Wilshire Boulevard is one of the busiest in Los Angeles, with seven through lanes and four left turn lanes (going east/west). Most of the large office buildings in Westwood are located on Wilshire Boulevard.

South of Wilshire, Westwood Boulevard continues as a four-lane boulevard passing through many small businesses. This area of Westwood south of Wilshire Boulevard is often referred to as Tehrangeles because of its large Iranian-American population. Many of the businesses along Westwood Boulevard are Persian, reflecting these demographics. In particular, Westwood Boulevard is noted for a large number of Persian restaurants. Farther south, the Westside Pavilion Mall was formerly located at Westwood Boulevard's intersection with Pico Boulevard.

Westwood Boulevard ends south of National Boulevard in the Palms neighborhood of Los Angeles, as it curves to the east and turns into National Place. Later, National Place becomes National Boulevard when it crosses Overland Avenue. At this point, Westwood Boulevard is a primarily residential street.

Westwood Boulevard comes back further south at Charnock Road and finally ends on Washington Boulevard.

Plans to install bike lanes near UCLA have been contentious, with opponents claiming they would worsen traffic.

Transportation
 Santa Monica Freeway (Interstate 10, formerly US Route 66) crosses over Westwood Boulevard.
 Santa Monica Transit lines 8 and 12 run through Westwood Boulevard.
 The Metro E Line operates a rail station at Exposition Boulevard.

Notable landmarks

 Holmby Hall
 Janss Dome
 Ralphs Grocery Store building (Bratskeller - Egyptian Theater)
 Crest Theatre 
 Hammer Museum
 Ronald Reagan UCLA Medical Center
 Westside Pavilion
 Liberal Arts Masonic Temple

References

External links

Streets in Los Angeles
Boulevards in the United States
West Los Angeles
Westwood, Los Angeles